Tristan Xerri (born 15 March 1999) is an Australian rules footballer who plays for the North Melbourne Football Club in the Australian Football League (AFL). He was recruited with the 72nd draft pick in the 2017 AFL draft.

Early Football
Xerri played for his school side at Lakeview Senior College. He also played for the Caroline Springs Football Club, and later for the Western Jets in the NAB League.

AFL career
Xerri debuted in North Melbourne's four point loss against  in the fourth round of the 2020 AFL season. He kicked one goal, had 5 disposals and 3 tackles. In September 2020, Xerri signed a new two-year contract keeping him with  until 2022. On 6 October 2021, Xerri requested a trade to St Kilda. The trade failed to eventuate, and Xerri remained at North Melbourne.

Statistics
 Statistics are correct to the end of Round 16 2022

|- style="background-color: #eaeaea"
! scope="row" style="text-align:center" | 2018
|  || 38 || 0 || — || — || — || — || — || — || — || — || — || — || — || — || — || —
|-
! scope="row" style="text-align:center" | 2019
|  || 38 || 0 || — || — || — || — || — || — || — || — || — || — || — || — || — || —
|- style="background-color: #EAEAEA"
! scope="row" style="text-align:center" | 2020
|style="text-align:center;"|
| 38 || 4 || 4 || 0 || 13 || 6 || 19 || 5 || 8 || 1.0 || 0.0 || 3.3 || 1.5 || 4.8 || 1.3 || 2.0
|-
! scope="row" style="text-align:center" | 2021
|  || 38 || 8 || 1 || 2 || 26 || 34 || 60 || 14 || 17 || 0.1 || 0.2 || 3.2 || 4.2 || 7.5 || 1.7 || 2.1
|- style="background-color: #EAEAEA"
|-
! scope="row" style="text-align:center" | 2022
|  
|| 38 || 12 || 5 || 2 || 50 || 70 || 120 || 27 || 42 || 0.4 || 0.1 || 4.1 || 5.2 || 10.0 || 2.2 || 3.5
|- class="sortbottom"
! colspan=3| Career
| 24
| 10
| 4
| 89
| 110
| 199
| 46
| 67
| 0.4
| 0.1
| 3.7
| 4.5
| 8.2
| 1.9
| 2.7
|}

References

External links

1999 births
Living people
North Melbourne Football Club players
Australian rules footballers from Victoria (Australia)
Western Jets players